Juris Ģērmanis (born 4 April 1977) is a Latvian cross-country skier. He competed at the 1998 Winter Olympics and the 2002 Winter Olympics.

References

External links
 

1977 births
Living people
Latvian male cross-country skiers
Olympic cross-country skiers of Latvia
Cross-country skiers at the 1998 Winter Olympics
Cross-country skiers at the 2002 Winter Olympics
Sportspeople from Riga
20th-century Latvian people
21st-century Latvian people